Quality of life is the degree to which an individual is healthy, comfortable, and able to participate in or enjoy life events.

Quality of Life may also refer to:

 Quality of life (healthcare), a measure of the overall effect of medical issues on a patient
 Quality of Life (film), a 2004 drama starring Lane Garrison
 "The Quality of Life" (Star Trek: The Next Generation), a TV episode
 "The Quality of Life" (Yes Minister), a TV episode
 "Quality of Life" (The Dead Zone), a TV episode
 The Quality of Life, a 2008 TV movie following the series Da Vinci's Inquest and Da Vinci's City Hall
 The Quality of Life, a 2007 play by Jane Anderson

See also
 Quality-of-Life Index, a socioeconomic indicator created by the Economist Intelligence Unit